José Manuel Cortizas (12 June 1963 – 27 February 2021) was a Spanish sports journalist and voice actor. He worked as a columnist for El Correo. and dubbed the voice of Hiroshi Nohara in the cartoon series Crayon Shin-chan.

Biography
Cortizas began working for El Correo in the early 1990s, where he covered news on Bilbao Basket and golfer Jon Rahm, as well as live Formula One races and other rallies. Other sports he covered include football and boxing.

Cortizas dubbed for the series Crayon Shin-chan among others. He dubbed over a number of films and series.

José Manuel Cortizas died from COVID-19 during the COVID-19 pandemic in Spain in Barakaldo on 27 February 2021, at the age of 58.

References

1963 births
2021 deaths
20th-century Spanish journalists
People from Bilbao
Deaths from the COVID-19 pandemic in Spain